The Mirage is a 1920 British silent romance film directed by Arthur Rooke and starring Edward O'Neill, Dorothy Holmes-Gore and Douglas Munro. The screenplay was written by Guy Newall and Ivy Duke based on a story by E. Temple Thurston. The screenplay concerns a poor French aristocrat living in Bloomsbury who falls in love with a woman.

Cast
 Edward O'Neill ...  Viscount Guescon 
 Dorothy Holmes-Gore ...  Rozanne 
 Douglas Munro ...  Courtot 
 Geoffrey Kerr ...  Richard Dalziell 
 Blanche Stanley ...  Mrs. Bulpitt
 William Parry ...  Somerset

References

External links

1920 films
1920s romance films
British silent feature films
British romance films
Films directed by Arthur Rooke
British black-and-white films
1920s English-language films
1920s British films